Club Ciudad de Bolívar or Bolívar Voley (also named Personal Bolívar for sponsorship reasons) is an Argentine sports club based in San Carlos de Bolívar, Buenos Aires Province. The club, founded in 2002 as a volleyball institution at the initiative of local TV host Marcelo Tinelli, won the championship the same season it debuted, beating Rojas Scholem at the finals. Bolívar is also the most winning team of Argentina, with 7 championships won.

Apart from volleyball, other sports practised at Bolívar are football (which team participates in regional league Torneo Federal A, and field hockey.

History 
The club was founded on October 23, 2002, subsequent to that year's FIVB Men's World Championship held in Argentina. The club's foundation was initiative of TV host and entrepreneur Marcelo Tinelli (who was born in San Carlos de Bolívar). Tinelli called former national team captain Daniel Castellani to the project, which conceived the club as a youth player recruiter and former. The colors chosen were the light blue and white, as a tribute to the city of Bolívar's football team that wore those colors. 

Bolívar won the championship in the first league it played, the 2002-03 season, defeating Rojas Scholem in the finals. The squad would win its second consecutive title in the 2003-04 season. In 2006 Javier Weber became the team's manager. Under his coaching, the team won its first international title in Brazil.

The team has used different names for sponsorship reasons, such as Bolívar Signia, Orígenes Bolívar, DirecTV Bolívar, and Drean Bolívar among others.

Bolívar is the most successful team of the Argentine top division, having won 7 titles. The club also won the South American Men's Club Volleyball Championship in 2010, earning the right to represent the continent in the FIVB Men's Club World Championship.

Notable players
The following players are mentioned in the "history" section of the club's official website.

 Sebastián Firpo
 Guillermo Quaini
 Sebastián Jabif
 Eduardo Rodríguez
 Mariano Baracetti
 Alejandro Spajic
 Leonardo Patti
 Guillermo García
 Marcelo Román
 Santiago Darraidou
 Pablo Peralta
 Gabriel Arroyo
 Luciano de Cecco
 Diego Stepanenko
 Juan Pablo Alanís
 Pablo Meana
 Javier Filardi
 Badá
 Pezao
 William
 Wallace
 Dalibor Polak
 Gabriel Gardner
 Ronald Méndez
 Iván Márquez
 Thomas Edgar

Managers
 Daniel Castellani (2002–2006)
 Javier Weber (2006–present)

Titles

Domestic
Liga Argentina A1 (7): 2002–03, 2003–04, 2006–07, 2007–08, 2008–09, 2009–10, 2016-17

International
Copa Mercosur (1): 2007
Copa World Challenge (1): 2009
Copa Ciudad de Bolívar (1): 2010

References

External links
 

b
b
b